Domingo José Claros Pérez de Guzmán y de Silva, 13th Duke of Medina Sidonia (1691–1739) became Duke of Medina Sidonia in 1721.

In 1722, he married Josefa Fenicula López Pacheco y Moscoso-Osorio, a daughter of Mercurio Antonio López Pacheco y Portugal, 9th Marqués de Villena, 9th Duke of Escalona, Grandee of Spain, Captain General of the Spanish Royal Army, and Director of the Royal Spanish Academy, which he had founded in 1713. The Duke became a Knight of the Order of the Golden Fleece in 1724 .

One of his sisters, Juana, gained much wealth and power in 1713 by marrying Fadrique Vicente Álvarez de Toledo, the 9th Marquis of Villafranca del Bierzo, Grandee of Spain, Duke of Fernandina, Duke of Montalto, and Prince of Montalbano and Paternò.

1691 births
1739 deaths
Dukes of Medina Sidonia
Knights of the Golden Fleece of Spain
Medina Sidonia
Medina Sidonia